YurView is a group of cable television networks featuring both national and local lifestyle and sports programming. The group of networks are owned by Cox Communications and are available exclusively to Cox subscribers.

History
Beginning in February 2017, Cox began to rebrand their various local origination as YurView. The networks continued to broadcast local high school and college sports, as well as other non-sports programming of local interest. New national programming was also added. Two of the first new shows launched were Dash to the Desert, a show offering analysis of the NCAA tournament and Tech Trends, a show featuring highlights from the  Consumer Electronics Show.

Networks

YurView is also offered to Cox subscribers in Cleveland, Ohio and Sun Valley, Idaho, but it is unclear whether these areas carry local programming.

References

External links
 Official Website

Cox Communications
Television channels and stations established in 2017